Jonathan Osan (born 5 December 1996) is an Argentine professional footballer who plays as a midfielder.

Career
Osan's career started with Defensores de Belgrano. He made his pro debut for the club on 24 April 2016 against Deportivo Español, which was his sole appearance in the 2016 Primera B Metropolitana season. In the following campaign, 2016–17, he again featured just once - versus Acassuso in June 2017.

Career statistics
.

References

External links

Jonathan Osan on defeweb.com

1996 births
Living people
People from Escobar Partido
Argentine footballers
Association football midfielders
Primera B Metropolitana players
Defensores de Belgrano footballers
Sportspeople from Buenos Aires Province
21st-century Argentine people